After Dinner at Ornans (French: L'Après-dînée à Ornans) is an oil-on-canvas painting by the French Realist artist Gustave Courbet, painted in winter 1848–1849 in Ornans. It is now in the Palais des Beaux-Arts de Lille.  Its dimensions are 195 by 257 cm.

It was the first of Courbet's imposing paintings of Ornans subjects; others include The Stone Breakers and A Burial at Ornans. After Dinner at Ornans shows the influence of earlier French masters of genre painting such as Le Nain and Chardin. Courbet exhibited it in the Salon of 1849, where it won a medal and was purchased by the state. 
  
One of the first major paintings by Pierre-Auguste Renoir, Mother Anthony's Tavern (1866), would pay homage to this work, showing the influence of Courbet on the early Renoir.

References

Paintings by Gustave Courbet
1849 paintings
Food and drink paintings
Paintings in the collection of the Palais des Beaux-Arts de Lille